Delta Heat is a 1992 film directed by Michael Fischa and written by Sam A. Scribner. The buddy police film was shot in New Orleans, Louisiana.
The screenplay was originally written by Bruce Akiyama to be a television pilot, commissioned by Sawmill Entertainment, but after producer Richard L. Albert made The Forbidden Dance, he decided to hire writer Sam Scribner to expand the script to feature film length.  During production, producer Albert spent six hours in the bayous north of New Orleans convincing alligator hunter Bob Raymond to catch 40 alligators which appear in the final scene.

Plot
A Los Angeles Police Officer (Edwards) investigates the death of his partner in the swamps of Louisiana. He enlists the help of an ex-cop (Henriksen) who lost his hand to an alligator years before.

Main cast
 Anthony Edwards as Mike Bishop
 Lance Henriksen as Jackson Rivers
 Betsy Russell as Vicky Forbes
 Linda Dona as Tine Tulane
 Rod Masterson as Crawford
 Clyde Jones as Clayborne

References

External links
 
 

1992 films
1990s crime drama films
American crime drama films
American buddy cop films
Films set in Louisiana
Films shot in New Orleans
American police detective films
1990s police films
1990s buddy cop films
Films scored by Christopher Tyng
Films directed by Michael Fischa
1990s English-language films
1990s American films